Bhagyalakshmi (born 1 November 1962) is an Indian dubbing artist, actress, and activist. She works primarily in Malayalam Film Industry and has been dubbed for more than 800 actresses and more than 4700 films in Malayalam cinema; most notably for actresses Shobana, Samyuktha Varma, and Urvashi. Bhagyalakshmi published her autobiography, Swarabhedangal, which received the Kerala Sahitya Akademi Award for Biography and Autobiography.

Career

Bhagyalakshmi started dubbing at the age of 10 for child actors. Her first noted movie was Aparadhi in 1977, and became popular through her film Kolilakkam (dubbed for Sumalatha). She has also acted in around 20 Malayalam movies, with Manassu (1973) being her debut movie as a child artist. She has won the Kerala State Film Award for Best Actress for Various Heroines. She has won this award more than any other actress and is followed by Sreeja Ravi. In 2021, she entered the popular reality TV show Bigg Boss Malayalam Season 3 as a contestant and was evicted on Day 49.

Radio 
Bhagyalakshmi has worked as an announcer for All India Radio.

Dubbing

She started her dubbing career in films like Aparathi (1977). From 1978-1980, she dubbed numerous films for child actors and supporting heroines. Nokkethadhoorathu Kannum Nattu (1984) popularized her in the Malayalam film industry, after which she dubbed for numerous Malayalam films. She gave her voice to several leading heroines, such as Menaka, Urvashi, Jayapradha, Karthika, Parvathy, Gautami, Suhasini, Tabu, Shobana, Sukanya, Saritha, Bhanupriya, Rekha, Revathi, Monisha Unni, Radha, Raadhika, Renjini, Mohini, Padmapriya, Poornima Indrajith, Kavya Madhavan, Divya Unni, Samyuktha Varma, Indraja, Suhasini Maniratnam, Shwetha Menon, Meena, Geetu Mohandas, Bhavana, Nandini, Kanaka, Sridevi Kapoor, Anushka Shetty and Jyothika.

She dubbed for Shobana in the films Manichitrathazhu (1993), Mazhayethum Munpe (1995), Thenmavin Kombath (1994), Yathra (1985), and Innale (1990), for which she received wide acclaim in the Malayalam film industry.

Personal life

Bhagyalakshmi was born on 1 November 1962 to Kumaran Nair, who hails from Powaat Tharavadu in Kozhikode, and Bhargavi Amma from Kurupath Tharavadu in Shoranur. She has an elder sister, Indira Nair, and a brother, Unni Nair. 

She started her career as a dubbing artist at the age of 10 and went on to complete her pre-university course while working in the film industry. 

She lost her parents in childhood and married K. Ramesh Kumar on 27 October 1985. The couple has two sons. They separated in 2011 and officially divorced in September 2014. 

Her ex-husband died on 23 March 2021 due to kidney failure.

Publication

Bhagyalakshmi published her autobiography, Swarabhedangal and was selected by Nielsen Data as part of its best-seller list. This was the first time a Malayalam book was selected for this endowment.

Controversy

Assault case
On 26 September 2020, Bhagyalakshmi, along with two other activists, Diya Sana and Sreelakshmi Arakkal, inked and manhandled a YouTube Vlogger named Vijay P. Nair in his residence at Thiruvananthapuram. They alleged that one of his videos was a personal insult to her, even though her name was not explicitly mentioned in the post. Following that, she and the other two were charged with non-bailable offences, including criminal trespass and attempted murder.

Awards and honours

Bibliography

Partial filmography

As dubbing artist
This is not a complete list

Filmography as an actress
 Manassu (1973)
 Samudram (1977)
 Madalasa (1978)
 Surya Daham (1978)
 Nivedyam (1978)
 Kathu
 Padmatheertham (1978)
 Chamaram (1980)
 Manassinte Theerthayathra (1981)
 Ammakkorumma (1981)
Gaanam (1982)
 Dheera (1982)
 Mattuvin Chattangale (1982)
 Swantham Enna Karuthi (1989)
 Celluloid (2013)
 Njan Samvidhanam Cheyyum (2015)
 Pava (2016)
 Oru Muthassi Gadha (2016) as Susaamma
 Premanjali (2018)
 Adithya Varma (2019)
 Aniyan Kunjinum Thannalayathu (2019)
 Madhuram Jeevitham (2021-)

Dialogues or effects between songs

Television

As a television presenter
 Manassiloru Mazhavillu seasons 1, 2 (Kairali TV)
 Selfie (Kairali TV)
 Fast Track
 Dream Drive
 Charithram Enniloode

Television shows as judge
Tharolsavam 1, 2 (Kairali TV)
Star Singer 2008 (Asianet)

Television shows as participant
MY G Flowers Oru Kodi
Bigg Boss (Malayalam season 3)
 Smart Show

Serials
Miss Mary Therasa Paul — Dubbed for Beena Antony: She won best actress telefilm in Kerala State Television Award (1996)
Nombarapoovu — Dubbed for Reshmi Soman (2007)
Melapadam — Dubbed for Mini Nair (1996)
Kadamattath Kathanar — Dubbed for Thara Kalyan, Sukanya, Poornima Anand
Mandaram — Dubbed for Rekha (2008)
Akashadooth — Dubbed for Chippy (2010-2013)
Kumkumapoovu — Dubbed for Asha Sharath (2012-2015)
Koodathayi — Dubbed For Muktha (2019–2021)
Kaliveedu — Dubbed for Shanthi Krishna (2022)
 From 2000 to 2005 she dubbed many serials for various channels

References

External links

Sources

 Bhagyalakshmi Filmography
 
 

Living people
1962 births
Kerala State Film Award winners
Recipients of the Kerala Sahitya Akademi Award
Indian voice actresses
Actresses in Malayalam cinema
Indian film actresses
Actresses from Kozhikode
20th-century Indian actresses
21st-century Indian actresses
Bigg Boss Malayalam contestants